The canton of Plateau du Haut-Velay granitique is an administrative division of the Haute-Loire department, south-central France. It was created at the French canton reorganisation which came into effect in March 2015. Its seat is in Craponne-sur-Arzon.

It consists of the following communes:
 
Allègre
Beaune-sur-Arzon
Berbezit
Bonneval
La Chaise-Dieu
La Chapelle-Bertin
La Chapelle-Geneste
Chomelix
Cistrières
Connangles
Craponne-sur-Arzon
Félines
Jullianges
Laval-sur-Doulon
Malvières
Monlet
Roche-en-Régnier
Saint-Georges-Lagricol
Saint-Jean-d'Aubrigoux
Saint-Julien-d'Ance
Saint-Pal-de-Chalencon
Saint-Pal-de-Senouire
Saint-Pierre-du-Champ
Saint-Victor-sur-Arlanc
Sembadel
Varennes-Saint-Honorat

References

Cantons of Haute-Loire